Aaron Pickles (born 20 March 2005) is an English professional footballer who plays as a defender for  club Accrington Stanley.

Career
Pickles began his career at Accrington Stanley. On 14 October 2022, he joined Glossop North End on a work experience loan. He made his debut the following day, in a 2–1 home defeat to Macclesfield. He made his first-team debut for Accrington on 28 January 2023, after coming on as an 80th-minute substitute for Doug Tharme in a 3–1 defeat to Leeds United in an FA Cup fourth round match at the Crown Ground.

Career statistics

References

2005 births
Living people
English footballers
Association football defenders
Accrington Stanley F.C. players
Glossop North End A.F.C. players
Northern Premier League players
English Football League players